The Eichelbach is a river of Hesse, Germany.

Geography

Course
The Eichelbach has its source in Vogelsberg, north of the Hoherodskopfes and east of the town Schotten-Breungeshain. It discharges into the Nidda river at the town of Nidda.

Villages
The Eichelbach flows through the following villages:
Breungeshain
Busenbornn
Eschenrod
Wingershausen
Eichelsachsen
Eichelsdorf

Tributaries
 Eckardsbach (Waidbach) (left)
 Schandwiesenbach (left)

Water quality
The water quality of the Eichelback is deemed good.

See also
List of rivers of Hesse

References

External links

 Hessisches Landesamt für Naturschutz, Umwelt und Geologie: Retentionskataster für das Flußgebiet des Eichelbach (PDF-Datei; 653 kB)

Rivers of Hesse
Rivers of the Vogelsberg
Rivers of Germany